This is a list of the Iraq national football team results from 2010 to 2019.

Results

2010s
2010

2011

2012

2013

2014

2015

2016

2017

2018

2019

See also
Iraq national football team results

References

External links
Iraq fixtures on eloratings.net
Iraq on soccerway.com

2010s in Iraqi sport
2010